Mpho Balopi is a Motswana politician serving as the Minister of Employment, Labour Productivity and Skills Development since March 2020. He is also Secretary General for Botswana Democratic Party.

See also 

 Mokgweetsi Masisi
 Peggy Serame
 Slumber Tsogwane

References 

Living people
Year of birth missing (living people)
Members of the National Assembly (Botswana)
Botswana Democratic Party politicians
People from Gaborone
Microeconomists